Our Lady of the Rosary, also known as Our Lady of the Holy Rosary, is a Marian title.

The Feast of Our Lady of the Rosary, formerly known as Feast of Our Lady of Victory and Feast of the Holy Rosary is celebrated on 7 October in the General Roman Calendar. 7 October is the anniversary of the decisive victory of the combined fleet of the Holy League of 1571 over the Ottoman navy at the Battle of Lepanto.

Our Lady of the Rosary
According to Dominican tradition, in 1206, Dominic de Guzmán was in Prouille, France, attempting to convert the Albigensians back to the Catholic faith. The young priest had little success until one day he received a vision of the Blessed Virgin, who gave him the rosary as a tool against heretics. While Mary's giving the rosary to Dominic is generally acknowledged as a legend, the development of this prayer form owes much to the followers of Saint Dominic, including the 15th-century priest and teacher, Alanus de Rupe.

Our Lady of Victory
In 1571, Pope Pius V organized a coalition of forces from Spain and smaller Christian kingdoms, republics and military orders, to rescue Christian outposts in Cyprus, particularly the Venetian outpost at Famagusta which, however, surrendered after a long siege on 1 August before the Christian forces set sail. On 7 October 1571, the Holy League, a coalition of southern European Catholic maritime states, sailed from Messina, Sicily, and met a powerful Ottoman fleet in the Battle of Lepanto. Knowing that the Christian forces were at a distinct material disadvantage, Pope Pius V called for all of Europe to pray the Rosary for victory, and led a rosary procession in Rome.

After about five hours of fighting on the northern edge of the Gulf of Corinth, off western Greece, the combined navies of the Papal States, Venice and Spain managed to stop the Ottoman navy, slowing the Ottoman advance to the west and denying them access to the Atlantic Ocean and the Americas. If the Ottomans had won, there was a real possibility that an invasion of Italy could have followed so that the Ottoman sultan, already claiming to be emperor of the Romans, would have been in possession of both New and Old Rome.  Combined with the unfolding events in Morocco where the Sa'adids successfully spurned the Ottoman advances, it confined Turkish naval power to the eastern Mediterranean. Although the Ottoman Empire was able to build more ships, it never fully recovered from the loss of trained sailors and marines, and was never again the Mediterranean naval power it had become the century before when Constantinople fell.

Feast day
Pius V instituted the feast of Our Lady of Victory in order to commemorate the victory at Lepanto, which he attributed to the Blessed Virgin Mary. Dedications to Our Lady of Victory had preceded this papal declaration. In particular, Simon de Montfort, 5th Earl of Leicester built the first shrine dedicated to Our Lady of Victory in thanks for the Catholic victory over the Albigensians at the Battle of Muret on September 12, 1213. In thanksgiving for victory at the Battle of Bouvines in July 1214, Philip Augustus of France founded the Abbey of Notre Dame de la Victoire, between Senlis and Mont l'Evêque.

In 1573, Pope Gregory XIII changed the name of the feast to Feast of the Holy Rosary, to be celebrated on the first Sunday of October. The Dominican friar Juan Lopez in his 1584 book on the rosary states that the feast of the rosary was offered "in memory and in perpetual gratitude of the miraculous victory that the Lord gave to his Christian people that day against the Turkish armada".

In 1671 the observance of this festival was extended by Clement X to the whole of Spain, and somewhat later Clement XI, after the  victory over the Turks gained by Prince Eugene in the Battle of Petrovaradin on 5 August 1716 (the feast of Our Lady of the Snows), commanded the feast of the Rosary to be celebrated by the universal Church.

Leo XIII raised the feast to the rank of a double of the second class and added to the Litany of Loreto the invocation "Queen of the Most Holy Rosary". On this feast, in every church in which the Rosary confraternity has been duly erected, a plenary indulgence toties quoties is granted upon certain conditions to all who visit therein the Rosary chapel or statue of Our Lady. This has been called the "Portiuncula" of the Rosary.

Pius X in 1913 changed the date to 7 October, as part of his effort to restore celebration of the liturgy of the Sundays. In 1960 under Pope John XXIII it is listed under the title Feast of the Blessed Virgin Mary of the Rosary; and under the 1969 liturgical reforms of Pope Paul VI Our Lady of the Rosary is mentioned as a mandatory memorial.

Patronage

Our Lady of the Rosary is the patron saint of several places around the world. The Diocese of Malaga, Spain (which, however celebrates her patronage on September 8), and the Spanish cities of Melilla and Trujillo celebrate Our Lady of Victory as their patroness.

María del Rosario is a common female Spanish name (colloquially abbreviated to Rosario or Charo). Rosario can also be used as a male first name, particularly in Italian.

Churches dedicated to Our Lady of the Rosary

The Basilica of Our Lady of the Rosary in the Sanctuary of Fátima (or Marian Shrine of Our Lady of Fátima) in Cova da Iria, in the city of Fátima, Portugal, is dedicated to Our Lady of the Rosary.

The Chapel of the Virgin of the Rosary in Puebla City, Mexico, is a chapel that was described in its time as the Eighth Wonder of the World in a print of 1690, regarded like this for a long time in the New Spain. It was built between 1531 and 1690.

The cathedral for the Diocese of Toledo in Toledo, Ohio, is under the patronage of Our Lady Of the Rosary as well as the cathedral of Duluth, Minnesota and the Diocese of San Bernardino.

The church of Our Lady of the Rosary on State Street in New York City began in 1883 as the Mission of Our Lady of the Rosary for the protection of Irish immigrant girls; it houses the shrine of St. Elizabeth Ann Seton. A new Sanctuary was erected in the province of Buenos Aires, Argentina in honor of Our Lady of the Rosary of San Nicolás and apparitions and locations were approved "worthy of belief" by the local ordinary in May 2006. Our Lady of the Rosary church is in Jashpur, Chhattisgarh, India. It is the second largest church in Asia, by seating capacity which can accommodate 10,000 worshippers.

The Metropolitan Cathedral of Our Lady of the Holy Rosary or Holy Rosary Cathedral is located in Vancouver, Canada.

The first Mass at Our Lady of the Rosary church in New Orleans, Louisiana was held on Christmas of 1907 by Archbishop James Hubert Blenk. In September 1908, a parish school was opened. On April 19, 1910, the Congregation of Our Lady of the Holy Rosary of the Roman Catholic Church was incorporated. The Main Altar was consecrated December 6, 1925, and December 6, 1969 was chosen by Bishop Caillouet for the consecration of the altar facing the people.

Churches named for Our Lady of Victory
Although the title Our Lady of Victory has been superseded to some extent by that of Our Lady of the Rosary, the former is still in popular use at a number of parishes and schools.

 Notre-Dame-des-Victoires, Paris is an historic Marian shrine and place of pilgrimage. Augustinian friars built it between 1629 and 1740 with financial assistance from Louis XIII, who named the church Notre-Dame des Victoires in gratitude for the victory of French forces over the Huguenots at the Siege of La Rochelle (1627-8).
 The Church of Our Lady of Victory (Kostel Panny Marie Vítězné) in Prague houses the 16th-century Infant Jesus of Prague.
 Notre-Dame-des-Victoires, San Francisco was founded in 1856 to serve French Catholic immigrants to California. In 1887, Pope Leo XIII signed the decree putting l'Eglise Notre Dame des Victoires in charge of the Marists, and making it a French National Church. The church was rebuilt in 1915 after the earthquake and fire of 1906, and was declared an historical landmark in 1984.
 Our Lady of Victory National Shrine and Basilica is located in Lackawanna, New York.
Our Lady of Victory is the cathedral church for the Diocese of Victoria, Texas. 
 The church of Our Lady of Victory, also known as the War Memorial Church, in the financial district of Manhattan, New York City, was dedicated to Our Lady of Victory by Francis Cardinal Spellman, archbishop of New York and apostolic vicar for the U.S. Armed Forces on June 23, 1947 " ... in Thanksgiving for Victory won by our valiant dead, our soldiers' blood, our country’s tears, shed to defend men’s rights and win back men’s hearts to God."
 The chapel at St. Catherine University, St. Paul, Minnesota, is named for Our Lady of Victory, and is listed on the National Register of Historic Places.
 St. Mary of Victories Hungarian Catholic Church is located in St. Louis, Missouri. St. Mary's was built in 1843, and is the second oldest Catholic Church within the city limits. Originally home to German immigrants, the parish became home to the Hungarian Community in 1957 and is the official Hungarian Church for the Archdiocese of St. Louis.
Our Lady of Victories, Kensington is located in London, England. The Church was at one point the Pro-Cathedral in the Archdiocese of Westminster, and was heavily bombed in World War II.
The Chapel of Our Lady of Victory, an abandoned 18th-century chapel located in São Francisco do Conde, Bahia, Brazil

See also
 Churches named for the Rosary
 Holy Rosary Church
 Shrine of the Virgin of the Rosary of Pompei

References

External links 

 Information on the feast day of Our Lady of the Rosary

Catholic holy days
October observances
Rosary
Titles of Mary
Catholic Mariology
Marian feast days
Marian devotions